Gülşah Kocatürk (born January 1, 1986, in Izmir) is a Turkish judoka competing in the heavyweight (78 kg+) division.  she is a member of İzmir Büyükşehir Belediyespor.

Gülşah Kocatürk studied physical education and sports at Balıkesir University.

She won a bronze medal at the 2009 Mediterranean Games held in Pescara, Italy and another bronze medal at the 2009 European Judo Championships in Tbilisi, Georgia. In 2009, she won the silver medal at the World Judo Cup held in Madrid, Spain. At the 2008 European Junior Judo Championships in Zagreb, Croatia, Kocatürk received the gold medal.

Gülşah Kocatürk qualified for participation at the 2012 Summer Olympics, where she lost in the second round to Iryna Kindzerska.

Achievements

See also
 Turkish women in sports

References

External links
 
 

1986 births
Sportspeople from İzmir
Living people
Turkish female judoka
Turkish female martial artists
Olympic judoka of Turkey
Judoka at the 2012 Summer Olympics
European Games competitors for Turkey
Mediterranean Games bronze medalists for Turkey
Competitors at the 2009 Mediterranean Games
Mediterranean Games medalists in judo
Judoka at the 2015 European Games
20th-century Turkish sportswomen
21st-century Turkish sportswomen